Oleksiy Lutsenko (born 3 March 1997 in Ukraine) is a Ukrainian football defender.

Career
Lutsenko is a product of the different youth sportive school systems.

In 2014 he signed contract with FC Vorskla and continued his career as player in the Ukrainian Premier League Reserves. And in summer 2017 Lutsenko was promoted to the main-squad team of FC Vorskla in the Ukrainian Premier League. He made his debut as a substituted player for Vorskla Poltava in the Ukrainian Premier League in a match against FC Stal Kamianske on 12 August 2017.

References

External links
 
 

1997 births
Living people
Ukrainian footballers
Association football defenders
FC Vorskla Poltava players
Ukrainian Premier League players